Ruginoasa is a commune in Neamț County, Western Moldavia, Romania. It is composed of two villages, Bozienii de Sus and Ruginoasa.

References

Communes in Neamț County
Localities in Western Moldavia